Qaid is a Pakistani television series aired on Geo Entertainment during 2018–19. It is produced by Wajahat Rauf and Shazia Wajahat under their banner Showcase Productions. It stars Zara Noor Abbas and Syed Jibran. It received low viewership ratings and according to The News International, Qaid didn't work well for Abbas.

Plot

Rehaam (Zara Noor Abbas and Aashir (Syed Jibran) studied together in college and have been good friends, soon they fall in love. Ashir’s mother has taken over his deceased father’s business and has been struggling to keep this business alive, in the midst of all this she sends Ashir abroad to save the ongoing contracts. Before Ashir leaves he wants both families to meet and finalize his proposal for Rehaam. But unfortunately, Reham’s taya springs up the subject of her marriage with his son and her father and taya end up in a big fight and Rehaam asks Ashir not to bring his family as her father is not well.
Heartbroken but willing to help his mother Ashir leaves the country soon while Rehaam is venturing into home tuitions and end up hired as Adaan’s teacher who is Ashir’s younger brother. This fact remains hidden as she builds a rapport with both Adaan and Ashir’s mother. All this leads to Adaan having a crush on Rehaam which at first Rehaam didn't notice but as soon as she finds Adaan’s behavior unusual she discourages it and leaves this job.

Rehaam will accept the proposal and right on her wedding day, Adaan does something that brings Rehaam’s life to a point of no return. Rehaam makes many sacrifices and suffers because of others' misdeeds. But will she finally achieve a happy life?

Cast
Zara Noor Abbas as Rehaam 
Syed Jibran Shah as Ashirr
Waseem Abbas as Tufeeq; Ashirr's uncle
Marina Khan as Sofia; Ashirr and Adan's mother
Gul-e-Rana as Appa Bi, Ashirr's grandmother
Nida Mumtaz as Shakra; Reham's mother
Mariam Ansari as Farah; Tufeeq and Tasneem's daughter, Ashirr's cousin
Farah Nadeem as Tasneem; Tufeeq's wife, Farah's mother
Saifullah Sohail as Adan; Reham's student, Ashirr's brother, Sofia's younger son
Abdullah Khan as Suboor 
Mehboob Sultan as Inspector
Jibran Nusrat Jahan as Parveen
Shehzad Malik as Rehmat 
Ahmer Hussain as Muneer 
Rameez Siddiqui as Ahmed
Tariq Jameel as Barkat

References

External links
Official website

Geo TV original programming
Urdu-language television shows
Pakistani drama television series
2018 Pakistani television series debuts
2019 Pakistani television series endings